Germany national hockey team may refer to:

 Germany men's national ball hockey team
 Germany men's national field hockey team
 Germany women's national field hockey team
 Germany men's national ice hockey team
 Germany women's national ice hockey team
 Germany men's national ice sledge hockey team
 Germany men's national inline hockey team
 Germany women's national inline hockey team
 Germany national roller hockey team